Green Lake Falls is a large, very difficult to access waterfall located a short distance below the outlet of remote Green Lake, in North Cascades National Park, Whatcom County, Washington. It has several tiers, including a 300-foot (91 m) slide and a 500-foot (152 m) plunge.

Above that is Green Lake itself, which is fed by several large, glacial streams originating from the Green Lake Glacier. The largest one contains unofficially named Bacon Lake Falls.

References 

Waterfalls of Washington (state)
Waterfalls of Whatcom County, Washington
North Cascades National Park
Tiered waterfalls